Ardath may refer to:

Aircraft
 Mantainer Ardath, an Australian non-rigid airship, flown in the 1970s

Places
 Ardath, Missouri
 Ardath, Saskatchewan
 Ardath, Western Australia

People
 Ardath Mayhar

Literature
 Ardath (novel), an 1889 novel by Marie Corelli